Tangled Lives is a 1917 American silent drama film produced and distributed by the Fox Film Corporation. The film was directed by J. Gordon Edwards and starred husband and wife stage actors Genevieve Hamper and Robert B. Mantell.

This film is a version of the 1860 Wilkie Collins novel The Woman in White. Several versions of this novel have been produced over the years, one in 1912, two in 1917 including this film, a 1929 talkie, and a remake in 1948.

Cast
Genevieve Hamper as Laura Fairlie / Ann Catherick
Stuart Holmes as Roly Schuyler
Robert B. Mantell as Dassori
Walter Miller as Walter Hartwright
Henry Leone as Pesca
Claire Whitney as Marion Halcombe
Genevieve Blinn as Countess Dassori
Louise Rial
Millie Liston (billed as Millicent Liston)
William Gerald
Hal De Forrest
Jane Lee (billed as Little Janey Lee)

Preservation status
This film is now considered a lost film.

See also
List of lost films
List of Fox Film films
1937 Fox vault fire

References

External links

Tangled Lives at AllMovie
Lobby poster

1917 films
American silent feature films
Lost American films
Films based on works by Wilkie Collins
Films directed by J. Gordon Edwards
Fox Film films
1917 drama films
Silent American drama films
American black-and-white films
1917 lost films
Lost drama films
1910s American films